Vinod Kumar Choubey, KC was an Indian Police Service officer of 1998 batch who was martyred in an encounter with naxalites in the Rajnandgaon ambush in July 2009. Choubey was posthumously awarded with peacetime gallantry award 'Kirti Chakra' by Hon. President of India Smt. Pratibha Devisingh Patil in March 2011 .

Early life 
Choubey was born to Smt. Kamla Devi Choubey and Dwaraka Prasad Choubey, a senior journalist who worked for a Nagpur-based English daily before starting his own newspaper, 'Bilaspur Times'. Choubey was lecturer of chemistry at the Girls PG College in Bilaspur before joining the state police service of undivided Madhya Pradesh as a Deputy Superintendent in 1983. In 1996, he was selected for the Indian Police Service.

Police career 
Choubey served as Superintendent of Police in the districts of Balrampur, Raipur, Surguja and North Bastar before being posted as Superintendent of Police, Rajnandgaon. While being posted at District Balrampur in 2003, he had been shot at and injured by Maoists in Balrampur, bordering Jharkhand. Later, as SP, Kanker, he survived a Naxalite ambush in the state's tribal Bastar region. He received President's medal for distinguished services in 2003.
Choubey is known to have unearthed a naxal urban network in the cities of Raipur and Bhilai in 2008 which led to several arrests and confiscation of arms. As a result of these actions it is claimed that he was once considered a major threat by the insurgents and thus was a top priority target. He is the only Indian Police Service officer in the state of Chhattisgarh to have died to naxal violence.

Rajnandgaon ambush 

While posted as Superintendent of Police, Rajnandgaon, Chhattisgarh on 12 July 2009 he received a message that naxalites have attacked Madanwara outpost of PS Manpur, District Rajnandgaon and killed two policemen. He left for the spot along with his force. En route, his carcade was fired upon by naxalites injuring his driver. Choubey then took control of the vehicle and took the injured driver to safety. After regrouping and clearing fresh road blocks set up by naxalites he arrived at the spot where a fierce encounter ensued. He then counterattacked from his position which hit the naxalite right flank thus forcing them to pull back. A transport bus of civilians which had entered amidst the ambush was also rescued to safety. About 300 naxalites came from the forest firing fiercely. Many climbed up the trees and threw grenades incessantly at the police party. Police was caught in a precarious situation and were exposed in the open without any cover. Choubey then  decided to make a dent in the naxal attack, and moved from his position and sprang towards the naxalites in the trenches 10 meters away and fired at them but was hit by a bullet and finally succumbed  to his injuries.

Choubey received the peacetime gallantry award Kirti Chakra.

References 

2009 deaths
Deaths by firearm in India
Indian police officers killed in the line of duty
People from Bilaspur, Chhattisgarh
People murdered in Chhattisgarh
Recipients of the Kirti Chakra
Kirti Chakra
People from Rajnandgaon
1960 births